The Contemporary Arts Centre is located in Hanoi, Vietnam that showcases modern Vietnamese art.

Literature

External links 
 Hanoi Contemporary Arts Centre

Museums in Hanoi
Art museums and galleries in Vietnam
Contemporary art galleries in Asia